Martin Arnold (May 14, 1929, New York City – June 4, 2013 Manhattan) was an American journalist who spent nearly four decades at The New York Times.

In 1968, Arnold received the George Polk Award for Political Reporting.

Arnold's positions at the Times included:
 media editor (early 1990s)
 book editor for Culture Desk and publishing columnist (late 1990s/early 2000s)

Arnold died on June 4, 2013, at his home in Manhattan from complications of Parkinson's disease.  He was 84.

Early life
Arnold was born Martin Katske to Arnold and Evelyn Katske, and raised on Long Island.  When his father died, his mother changed their surname to Arnold.  He earned a bachelor's degree from what was then Adelphi College in Garden City.

Notes

1929 births
2013 deaths
George Polk Award recipients
American columnists
The New York Times writers
Deaths from Parkinson's disease
Neurological disease deaths in New York (state)
Writers from Manhattan
20th-century American journalists
American male journalists
People from Long Island
Adelphi University alumni